Étienne Blanc (born 29 August 1954) is a French politician who has served as a Senator for Rhône since 2020. A member of The Republicans (LR), he previously served as Mayor of Divonne-les-Bains (1991–2019) and represented the 3rd constituency of Ain in the National Assembly (2002–2016). Blanc was also First Vice President of the Regional Council of Auvergne-Rhône-Alpes from 2016 to 2020.

Political career
A member of the Union for a Popular Movement, which became The Republicans in 2015, Blanc represented the 3rd constituency of the Ain department in the National Assembly from 2002 until his resignation in 2016, triggered by his will to focus on his activities on the regional level. He also served as Mayor of Divonne-les-Bains from 1991 until 2019.

Following the 2015 regional elections, Laurent Wauquiez was elected to the presidency of the Regional Council of Auvergne-Rhône-Alpes on 4 January 2016. Blanc became his deputy, as he was elected First Vice President of the Regional Council the same day. He had previously been a regional councillor of Rhône-Alpes from 1992 to 2002.

Blanc was The Republicans' candidate for Mayor of Lyon in the 2020 municipal election, in which the list he led placed second before merging with the list of La République En Marche! (LREM) led by Yann Cucherat. He was elected to the municipal council for the 3rd arrondissement. On 4 July 2020, he took office as a municipal councillor and group president in the municipal council. In the 2020 Senate election, he was returned to the French Parliament for Rhône. He later resigned as Wauquiez's deputy.

In the 2021 The Republicans congress, he supported Michel Barnier. In late 2021, he resigned from the group presidency in the municipal council of Lyon following favourable comments he made on Éric Zemmour, which displeased members of his group.

Ahead of the 2022 presidential elections, Blanc publicly declared his support for Michel Barnier as the Republicans’ candidate.

References

1954 births
Living people
People from Givors
Politicians from Auvergne-Rhône-Alpes
Union for a Popular Movement politicians
The Republicans (France) politicians
Deputies of the 12th National Assembly of the French Fifth Republic
Deputies of the 13th National Assembly of the French Fifth Republic
Deputies of the 14th National Assembly of the French Fifth Republic
Deputies for Ain (French Fifth Republic)
Regional councillors of Auvergne-Rhône-Alpes
Senators of Rhône (department)
French Senators of the Fifth Republic